Trifolium aureum, known by the various common names large hop trefoil, large trefoil, large hop clover, golden clover or hop clover, is a species of flowering plant native to much of Eurasia.

Large hop trefoil is a small erect herbaceous biennial plant growing to 10–30 cm tall. Like all clovers, it has leaves divided into three sessile leaflets, each leaflet 15–25 mm long and 6–9 mm broad. Its yellow flowers are arranged into small, elongated round inflorescences 12–20 mm diameter, located at the end of the stem. Each individual flower is decumbent. As they age, the flowers become brown and paper-like. The fruit is a pod usually containing two seeds.

The closely related Trifolium campestre (hop trefoil) is a similar, but shorter, spreading, species with smaller leaves and flowers. The middle leaflet of its leaves also has a short rachis.

Cultivation and uses
The plant is very common, and grows well on poor, undisturbed grounds. While it probably has good nutritive values, perennial species are favored as forage.

Distribution
Trifolium aureum is native throughout Europe (in Russia this includes non-European Ciscaucasia and western Siberia; in Spain only in the north-east; and in the European portion of the Ukraine this includes Crimea);  western and northern Asia and the Middle East (in Armenia; Azerbaijan; Georgia; northern Iran; Lebanon; and Turkey); and Africa (limited to the Canary Islands).

Trifolium aureum is widely naturalized in North America: it was first introduced to the U.S. (by way of Pennsylvania) in 1800, where it is now found in the western (as far north as Alaska) and eastern regions of the country, but not in the middle, or very much in the southern states. It is also now found in Canada in all of its southerly provinces (with a possible exception being Manitoba).

Similar plants
Large hop trefoil, Trifolium aureum,  may be confused with other plants that have three leaflets and small yellow flowers, such as hop trefoil (T. campestre), lesser hop trefoil (T. dubium), black medick (Medicago lupulina),  and yellow woodsorrel (Oxalis stricta).

References

External links
Jepson Manual Treatment - Trifolium aureum
Washington Burke Museum
Trifolium aureum - Photo gallery

aureum
Plants described in 1777
Flora of Europe
Flora of Western Asia
Flora of Armenia
Flora of Azerbaijan
Flora of the Canary Islands
Flora of Georgia (country)
Flora of the Alps
Flora of Lebanon and Syria